Rignold is a surname. Notable people with the surname include: 

George Rignold (1839–1912), English actor
Hugo Rignold (1905–1976), English conductor and violinist
William Rignold (1836–1904), English actor, brother of George